Lubiri (or Mengo Palace) is the royal compound of the Kabaka or king of Buganda, located in Mengo, a suburb of Kampala, the Ugandan capital. The original Lubiri was destroyed in the May 1966 Battle of Mengo Hill, at the culmination of the struggle between Mutesa II and Milton Obote for power.

References

Buganda
Royal residences in Uganda
Buildings and structures in Kampala